Craneballs Studio is a video game development company based in the Czech Republic. It was founded in 2008. The company originally focused on web design and making graphics. It started to develop video games near the end of 2008 due to the financial crisis of 2007–08. Its first video game was released in 2009 and was financially successful. Its other games were successful too, so the studio has grown from three people to around 20.

Games 
2009 – Blimp: The Flying Adventures – An arcade game developed with Grip Games.
2009 – 33rd Division – A stealth action video game.
2010 – Monorace – An infinity running game
2010 – SuperRope – An arcade game.
2011 – Overkill – A rail shooter.
2012 - Fish Heroes - An arcade game inspired by Angry Birds.
2013 – Overkill 2 – A sequel to the original Overkill.
2013 – 33rd Division – A reboot of a 2009 video game.
2014 - Overkill Mafia - A spin-off to the main Overkill series.
2015 - Overkill 3 - The third game in the Overkill series.
2015 - Overcute: Cube Worm - game inspired by Snake
2015 - Delta Force Army Training - First-person shooter
2015 - Splash Cars - An arcade game.
2016 - Ninja Madness - Platform game
2019 - Planet Nomads - A Sandbox game.

References 

Video game companies of the Czech Republic
Video game companies established in 2008
Video game development companies
Czech companies established in 2008